M621 can refer to:

M621 motorway, a road in England
M621 cannon, a 20 mm cannon